Robert "Bob" Christman (born December 7, 1942, in Ottawa, Illinois) is an American curler.

He played at the 1988 Winter Olympics when curling was a demonstration sport, USA men's team finished on fourth place.

Awards
 United States Curling Association Hall of Fame:
 1995 (as curler);
 2017 (with all 1978 world champions team: skip Bob Nichols, third Bill Strum and second Tom Locken).

Teams

References

External links

Video: 

Living people
1942 births
People from Ottawa, Illinois
American male curlers
World curling champions
American curling champions
Curlers at the 1988 Winter Olympics
Olympic curlers of the United States